Sheoraphuli Junction is a Kolkata Suburban Railway station on the Howrah–Bardhaman main line and is located in Hooghly district in the Indian state of West Bengal.  It serves Sheoraphuli area & northern part of the Serampore City. The Sheoraphuli–Tarakeswar branch line meets Howrah–Bardhaman main line at Sheoraphuli.

History
The first passenger train in eastern India ran from Howrah to Hooghly on 15 August 1854. The track was extended to Raniganj by 1855.

The broad-gauge Sheoraphuli–Tarakeswar branch line was opened by the Tarkessur Railway Company on 1 January 1885 and was worked by East Indian Railway Company.  Testing of electric locomotives with some coaches on section Belur  to  Konnagar  commenced  on 10 November 1957.  On  four suburban  trains, hauled  by  electric  locomotives,  introduced on the section Howrah to Sheoraphuli from 1 December 1957, a saving of 11 minutes per run compared  to  steam services was achieved.

Electrification
Electrification of Howrah–Burdwan main line was completed with 3 kV DC overhead system in 1958.
Howrah–Sheoraphuli–Tarakeswar line was electrified in 1957–58. It was converted to 25 kV AC in the 1970s

References

External links
  Trains from Howrah
 Trains to Howrah

Railway stations in Hooghly district
Howrah railway division
Serampore
Kolkata Suburban Railway stations